Metal Lords is a 2022 American teen comedy-drama film written by D. B. Weiss and directed by Peter Sollett. Its story follows two high school best friends and metal music lovers, Hunter and Kevin, who set out to start a metal band, against societal norms. The film was  released on Netflix on April 8, 2022.

Plot
Metalhead Hunter Sylvester jams with his best friend, the insecure Kevin Schlieb, who does not know quite well how to play a whole drum set because he only plays a single drum in the school's marching band. During one of the marching band practices, Kevin witnesses sensitive Scottish student Emily having a full meltdown and quitting the band because of her lack of skills with the clarinet. Later that day, Kevin drags Hunter to a party at Clay Moss' house and tries to be a normal kid while Hunter feels misplaced. Kevin gets drunk and flirts with a girl named Kendall, while Hunter gets into an altercation with jock Rocky "Skip" Hoffman. In the aftermath, Hunter discovers that the school will hold a "Battle of the Bands" and it prompts him to sign up his and Kevin's band named Skullfucker. Hunter steals his father's AMEX card and spends US$13,500 in gear, including a full drum kit for Kevin. Kevin starts practicing at school and during one of those sessions, he discovers that Emily is in fact a skilled cello player. They become interested in each other, which prompts Kevin to give her a copy of a playlist of metal songs that Hunter assigned him as "homework". Meanwhile, Hunter tries to find a bassist to complete the trio, only to be unsuccessful because of lack of interest from the other students, and has a series of run-ins with Skip.

Kevin unsuccessfully tries to pitch Emily as their new bassist to Hunter. Afterwards, Kevin calls Emily to apologize for Hunter's behavior and they end up having sex in the back of Emily’s van. Kevin and Emily become a couple, which enrages Hunter, who believes that she will be their "Yoko Ono". Clay hears Kevin playing drums and, since Clay's drummer is going to rehab for substance abuse, Clay asks Kevin to join his band Mollycoddle, for his sister's wedding that weekend. During a speech class, Hunter teases Emily to the point of her melting down, attacking him, and breaking his guitar in the process. Those two facts lead to an argument between Hunter and Kevin, who leaves Skullfucker.

Kevin performs with Mollycoddle at Clay's sister's wedding, while Hunter tries to break into the wedding to get Kevin back into Skullfucker and is arrested for trespassing. Afterwards, Kevin is invited to hang out with Clay's friends and to perform with Mollycoddle in the Battle of the Bands, which he reluctantly accepts. Kendall invites a drunk Kevin into the pool and flirts with him. While they make out, Kevin's conscience materializes in the form of heavy-metal musicians Scott Ian, Tom Morello, Kirk Hammett and Rob Halford. Halford makes Kevin realize that he indeed loves Emily and gets back with her. Kevin also realizes that he needs Hunter back, only to discover that Hunter was sent to rehab by his father, as a punishment for his misbehavior.

Hunter discovers that the clinic is run by Dr. Troy Nix, famed lead guitarist of metal band Killoton and former Battle of the Bands champion; Nix explains that Killoton broke up because of his alcohol abuse and fraught relationships among the band members, which prompted Nix to get his life straight, become a doctor and help other addicts. Dr. Nix says that, while Hunter is fit for discharge, it won't happen until the next week because of the clinic's policies. Kevin breaks into the clinic and breaks out Hunter and Mollycoddle's drummer; they run into Dr. Nix during their escape, but Nix lets them go after giving Hunter a better guitar pick. Hunter and Kevin go to Emily's home, where Hunter apologizes to Emily and invites her to be their cellist, but Emily turns them down, saying that she's not ready yet.

On the night of the Battle of the Bands, Kevin apologizes to Clay, saying that he can only play in one band, but presents Mollycoddle's drummer, now sober, to replace him. As Kevin and Hunter are getting ready for their performance as a duo Emily appears to perform with them with an electric cello and decked out in gothic-metal attire. Just as they're about to take the stage, Dean Swanson warns them that the name "Skullfucker" is inappropriate for the event, forcing Emily to quickly change the band's name to Skullflower. Despite initial skepticism and confusion, their performance wins over the crowd, until a drunk Skip is shoved out of a mosh pit and pushes Hunter into his amp stack in the middle of his solo, making Hunter fall down and get crushed by his amplifiers, breaking his leg in the process.

Later, Kevin, Emily and a recuperating Hunter read the city's newspaper reporting that they went viral with their concert, despite losing the Battle of the Bands and coming in second place to Mollycoddle; they conclude they're the moral winners of the contest (they were the last band to play, which made them headliners, the entire crowd loved them and sang the chorus of their original song, and Hunter's injury landed them on the front page of the newspaper) and they begin to practice in Hunter's basement with renewed vigor and camaraderie.

Cast

Scott Ian, Tom Morello, Kirk Hammett and Rob Halford appear in cameo roles as themselves representing Kevin's conscience.

Production
Metal Lords was shot in Portland, Oregon. The school scenes were shot at Parkrose Middle School and Parkrose High School, while the Battle of the Bands scenes were filmed at Revolution Hall.

Reception
 On Metacritic, the film has a weighted average score of 59 out of 100 based on reviews from 20 critics, indicating "mixed or average reviews".

References

External links
 
 

2022 films
2022 comedy-drama films
2020s English-language films
2020s high school films
2020s musical comedy-drama films
2020s teen comedy-drama films
American high school films
American musical comedy-drama films
American teen comedy-drama films
American teen musical films
English-language Netflix original films
Films directed by Peter Sollett
Films scored by Ramin Djawadi
Films shot in Portland, Oregon
Heavy metal films
2020s American films